Lantz Lamback (born June 30, 1986  in Augusta, Georgia) is an American swimmer. He competed at the 2008 Summer Paralympics and the 2012 Summer Paralympics.

References

1986 births
Living people
American male freestyle swimmers
Paralympic swimmers of the United States
Swimmers at the 2012 Summer Paralympics
Swimmers at the 2008 Summer Paralympics
Paralympic gold medalists for the United States
Paralympic bronze medalists for the United States
American disabled sportspeople
Sportspeople from Augusta, Georgia
Medalists at the 2008 Summer Paralympics
Medalists at the 2012 Summer Paralympics
S7-classified Paralympic swimmers
Paralympic medalists in swimming
American male backstroke swimmers
21st-century American people